The 1956 Dwars door België was the 12th edition of the Dwars door Vlaanderen cycle race and was held on 13 to 14 April 1956. The race started and finished in Waregem. The race was won by Lucien Demunster.

General classification

References

1956
1956 in road cycling
1956 in Belgian sport